George Pierce Baker (April 4, 1866 – January 6, 1935) was a professor of English at Harvard and Yale and author of Dramatic Technique, a codification of the principles of drama.

Biography
Baker graduated in the Harvard College class of 1887, served as Editor-in-Chief of The Harvard Monthly, and taught in the English Department at Harvard from 1888 until 1924. He started his "47 workshop" class in playwriting in 1905. He was instrumental in creating the Harvard Theatre Collection at Harvard University Library. In 1908 he began the Harvard Dramatic Club, acting as its sponsor, and in 1912 he founded Workshop 47 to provide a forum for the performance of plays developed within his English class. He was elected a Fellow of the American Academy of Arts and Sciences in 1914. Unable to persuade Harvard to offer a degree in playwriting, he moved to Yale University in 1925, where he helped found the Yale School of Drama. He remained there until his retirement in 1933.

Baker taught a seminar on Shakespeare and English drama at the Sorbonne University (Paris) in 1908.

Among those he taught in his playwriting class were Rachel Barton Butler, George Abbott, Philip Barry, S.N. Behrman, Hallie Flanagan, Hong Shen, Sidney Howard, Samuel Hume, Stanley McCandless, Eugene O'Neill, Florence Ryerson, Edward Sheldon, Josephine van der Grift, Maurine Dallas Watkins, and Thomas Wolfe. His Dramatic Technique (1919) offered a codification in English of the principles of the well-made play.

George Pierce Baker was the father of George P. Baker who was dean of Harvard Business School.

References

Further reading
 Bordelon, Suzanne. "A Reassessment of George Pierce Baker's" The Principles of Argumentation": Minimizing the Use of Formal Logic in Favor of Practical Approaches." College Composition and Communication 57.4 (2006): 763-788 online.
 Hinkel, Cecil Ellsworth. "An Analysis and evaluation of the 47 workshop of George Pierce Baker" ( Diss. The Ohio State University, 1959) online.
 Kempf, Christopher. "The Play’sa Thing: The 47 Workshop and the “Crafting” of Creative Writing." American Literary History 32.2 (2020): 243-272.
 Kinne, Wisner Payne. George Pierce Baker and the American Theatre (Harvard University Press, 2013).
 Reilly, Kara. "George Pierce Baker: A century of dramaturgs teaching playwriting." Contemporary Theatre Review 23.2 (2013): 107-113.

External links

 Collection Guide, George Pierce Baker Papers, Houghton Library, Harvard University
 
 
 Audio recording of Baker's 1920 play The Pilgrim Spirit at LostPlays.com
 Dramatic Technique at the Internet Archive
George Pierce Baker papers (MS 51). Manuscripts and Archives, Yale University Library. 
George Pierce Baker Papers. Yale Collection of American Literature, Beinecke Rare Book and Manuscript Library.

1866 births
1935 deaths
Theatrologists
Drama teachers
Fellows of the American Academy of Arts and Sciences
Harvard College alumni
Harvard University faculty
Harvard Extension School faculty
Yale University faculty
Members of the American Academy of Arts and Letters